WZRK (810 AM, "96.9 Z-Rock") is a radio station broadcasting an active rock music format. Licensed to Dodgeville, Wisconsin, United States, the station serves southwest Wisconsin and the West Madison Metropolitan area. The station is currently owned by Dodge Point Broadcasting Company.

On August 9, 2018, the then-WDMP dropped its country simulcast with WDMP-FM and changed its format to active rock, branded as "96.9 Z-Rock" and simulcasting on FM translator W245DE 96.9 FM Dodgeville. The station changed its call sign to WZRK on August 10, 2018.

References

External links
96.9 Z Rock Online

Active rock radio stations in the United States
ZRK (AM)